OS X Yosemite (version 10.10) is the eleventh major release of macOS, Apple Inc.'s desktop and server operating system for Macintosh computers.

OS X Yosemite was announced and released to developers on June 2, 2014, at WWDC 2014 and released to public beta testers on July 24, 2014. Yosemite was released to consumers on October 16, 2014. Following the Northern California landmark-based naming scheme introduced with OS X Mavericks, Yosemite is named after the national park.

System requirements
All Macintosh products capable of running OS X Mountain Lion (v10.8.x) are able to run Yosemite as the two operating systems have the same requirements. However, to take full advantage of the Handoff feature, additional minimum system requirements include a Mac with Bluetooth LE (Bluetooth 4.0). As with Mavericks and Mountain Lion, 2GB of RAM, 8GB of available storage, and Mac OS X Snow Leopard 10.6.8 or later are required.

These are the models that are compatible with OS X Yosemite:

iMac (Mid 2007 or later)
MacBook (Aluminum, Late 2008 or later)
MacBook Air (Late 2008 or later)
MacBook Pro (Mid 2007 or later)
Mac Mini (Early 2009 or later)
Mac Pro (Early 2008 or later)
Xserve (Early 2009)

These are the models that support new features such as Handoff, Instant Hotspot as well as AirDrop between Mac computers and iOS devices:

iMac (Late 2012 or later)
MacBook (Early 2015 or later)
MacBook Air (Mid 2012 or later)
MacBook Pro (Mid 2012 or later)
Mac Mini (Late 2012 or later)
Mac Pro (Late 2013)

Features

Design
Yosemite introduced a major overhaul of OS X's user interface, emphasizing flat graphic design over skeuomorphism, following the aesthetic introduced with iOS 7. It is the first major redesign of the OS X user interface since 10.5 Leopard. Other changes include thinner fonts and blurred translucency effects. Some icons have been changed to correspond with those of iOS 7 and iOS 8. Yosemite maintains the OS X desktop metaphor.

Other design changes include new icons, light and dark color schemes, and the replacement of Lucida Grande with Helvetica Neue as the default system typeface. It was the only macOS version to use Helvetica Neue as the default typeface, as in El Capitan it was again changed, this time to Apple's own, newly-designed San Francisco typeface. The Dock is now a 2D translucent rectangle instead of a skeuomorphic glass shelf, reminiscent of the Dock design used in early versions of OS X through Tiger and in iOS since iOS 7.

Continuity

Many of Yosemite's new features focus on the theme of "continuity", increasing its integration with other Apple platforms and services such as iOS and iCloud. The Handoff functionality allows the operating system to integrate with iOS 8 devices over Bluetooth LE and Wi-Fi; users can place and answer phone calls using their iPhone as a conduit, send and receive text messages, activate personal hotspots, or load items being worked on in a mobile app (such as Mail drafts or Numbers spreadsheets) directly into their desktop equivalent.

Notification Center
Notification Center features a new "Today" view, similar to that in iOS. The Today view can display information and updates from various sources, along with widgets. The widgets in the Today view are similar to those of iOS 8.

Photos
As of OS X 10.10.3, Photos replaces both iPhoto and Aperture. It uses iCloud Photo Library to upload all the user's photos across their devices.

Other
Spotlight is a more prominent part of the operating system; it now displays its search box in the center of the screen and can include results from online sources, including Bing, Maps, and Wikipedia. Stock applications such as Safari and Mail have been updated. In particular, many security features have been added to Safari, such as a custom history clearing option that lets users clear history, cookies, and other data from the previous hour, day, or two days. In addition, Apple added DuckDuckGo to its search offerings, a non-tracking search engine that doesn’t store users’ data. Safari allows you to remotely close tabs from an iOS device. Safari now supports browsing in private browsing mode with certain windows (as opposed to all the windows having to be either in or out of private browsing).

The green "zoom" button on windows now has a different function in applications that support full-screen mode. Instead of simply enlarging the window, the button now enters full-screen mode, eliminating the full-screen button at the top-right corner of windows that has been present since Mac OS X Lion. However, holding the Option key (⌥) while clicking the zoom button or double-clicking on the window chrome continues to invoke the original behavior.

JavaScript for Automation (JXA) is the new system-wide support for scripting with JavaScript, built upon JavaScriptCore and the Open Scripting Architecture. It features an Objective-C bridge which enables entire Cocoa applications to be programmed in JavaScript.

Along with other framework changes, CloudKit was integrated in this release. CloudKit functions as a Mobile Backend as a Service (MBaaS) and is one method for app developers to integrate access to Apple’s iCloud servers into their apps.

There is a "dark mode" in System Preferences which makes the Dock and menu bar darker.

Beta testing
Apple initiated a new public beta program for OS X, a practice not seen with its operating systems since 2000's  Mac OS X Public Beta, which had preceded the release of Mac OS X v10.0. Yosemite is part of the OS X Beta Seed Program, a public program that allows the first 1 million users to download and test the Yosemite beta at no charge. Beta testers are required to acknowledge the potential risks involved with prerelease software, and sign a non-disclosure agreement (NDA). The program began releasing Public Betas on July 24, 2014. Six public betas of Yosemite were released.

Reception
On release, Yosemite received positive reviews, with users praising the simplified user interface. Programmer John Siracusa, who had reviewed every OS release, wrote for Ars Technica that "Yosemite is an aesthetic one-way valve... switching back to Mavericks after a week or two in Yosemite is like returning to iOS 6. Everything looks embarrassingly chunky, glossy, and gaudy." Macworlds review generally praised Yosemite for its design, but noted that it had found WiFi network issues and that Continuity had proved unreliable.

Criticism
Yosemite faced problems with network stability and the discoveryd DNS program. Because of this, Apple replaced discoveryd with the mDNSResponder system (used in Mavericks) in 10.10.4. Another notable bug experienced on Yosemite was the 'Unicode of death' problem, following a similar bug in 2013, in which a meaningless Arabic text string could crash applications using the system text-display APIs. Some users who upgraded to Yosemite complained that the Finder fails to show the contents of folders.

Software developers and users have argued that Apple's yearly release schedule and development practices have compromised stability, and mean that no version of OS X is truly recommendable for users prioritizing reliability over new user interface design and features.

Spotlight on Yosemite by default reports the user's current location (at the city level) and all their search queries to Apple and third parties. Reporting by Spotlight can be disabled by the user, although, even if this is done, the Safari web browser will continue to send search terms to Apple unless the function is separately disabled.

Release history

Timeline of Mac operating systems

References

External links

OS X Yosemite: The Ars Technica Review

10
X86-64 operating systems
2014 software
Computer-related introductions in 2014